Joseph Swain was an English professional association footballer who played as a wing half. He played one game for Burnley in the Football League Second Division in the 1903–04 season.

References

English footballers
Association football defenders
Burnley F.C. players
English Football League players
Year of death missing
Year of birth missing